Ferronetti is an Italian surname. Notable people with the surname include:

Damiano Ferronetti (born 1984), Italian footballer
Ignazio Ferronetti (born 1908), Italian film editor and director

Italian-language surnames